Report from Hoople: P. D. Q. Bach on the Air was released on Vanguard Records in 1967. It is set up as a radio broadcast of the music of P. D. Q. Bach with Professor Peter Schickele as the DJ.

In addition to P. D. Q. Bach music, the record includes New Horizons in Music Appreciation, a piece in which Schickele and Robert Dennis do a play-by-play on a performance of the first movement of Beethoven's Fifth Symphony as if it were a baseball game.

On the back cover, Schickele thanks "members of his graduate seminar in Accidental Originality" including future famous composer Philip Glass.

Performers
Professor Peter Schickele, conductor, announcer, worm (that's an instrument)
I Virtuosi di Hoople
John Ferrante, bargain counter tenor
Robert Dennis, announcer
Heinrich Seifenblase, piano
Emmanuel Pedal, four-handed organist

Radio Log

Bright and Early Show
Track 1 (8:12)
00:00 Signature Theme (from Diverse Ayres On Sundrie Notions, S. 99 44/100)
00:16 Intro
01:34 Echo Sonata for Two Unfriendly Groups of Instruments, S. 99999999
04:52 Tag
05:00 Station Break
05:18 Commercial: "Do You Suffer?" (from Diverse Ayres On Sundrie Notions, S. 99 44/100)

Track 2 (11:53)
08:10 New Horizons in Music Appreciation: Beethoven's Fifth Symphony (Schickele, with Robert Dennis)
16:58 Time
17:23 Weather
18:17 News

Track 3 (5:04)
20:00 Intro
20:44 Traumarai for Unaccompanied Piano, S. 13
24:11 Station Break
24:26 Tag
24:44 Signature Theme

Dull and Late Show
Track 4 (9:27)
00:00 Signature Theme
00:40 Intro
01:09 Schleptet in E♭ Major, S. 0
Molto Larghissimo – Allegro Boffo
Menuetto con Brio ma senza Trio
Adagio Saccharino
Yehudi Menuetto
Presto Hey Nonny Nonnio
08:55 Tag
09:22 Station Break

Track 5 (7:22)
09:26 What's My Melodic Line? (featuring works by Archangelo Spumoni, fictitious composer)
14:30 Time
15:03 News

Track 6 (7:53)
16:45 Intro
17:26 Fugue in C Minor (Fuga Vulgaris from the Toot Suite for Calliope Four Hands, S. 212°)
20:11 Tag
20:42 Station Break
20:46 What's Happening in Home Economics (Beethoven's Revenge, containing a small selection from the middle of the first movement of Symphony No. 3 "Eroica")
21:34 Commercial: "If You Have Never" (from Diverse Ayres On Sundrie Notions, S. 99 44/100)
22:40 Sign-off
23:34 Signature Theme

Sources
P. D. Q. Bach on the Air, schickele.com

Albums conducted by Peter Schickele
Concept albums
P. D. Q. Bach albums
Vanguard Records albums
1960s comedy albums
1967 albums